Vavaea bantamensis is a species of plant in the family Meliaceae. It is endemic to Java in Indonesia.

References

bantamensis
Endemic flora of Java
Data deficient plants
Taxonomy articles created by Polbot